Abdul Mannan Talukder is a Bangladesh Nationalist Party politician and a former Jatiya Sangsad member representing the Sirajganj-3 constituency.

Career
Talukder was elected to parliament from Sirajganj-3 as a Bangladesh Nationalist Party candidate in 1991, February 1996, June 1996, and 2001.

References

Bangladesh Nationalist Party politicians
Living people
5th Jatiya Sangsad members
6th Jatiya Sangsad members
7th Jatiya Sangsad members
8th Jatiya Sangsad members
Year of birth missing (living people)
Place of birth missing (living people)